Senator Hanley or Hanlymay refer to:

Dana Hanley (fl. 1980s–1990s), Maine State Senate
Frank Hanly (1863–1920), Indiana State Senate
Joe R. Hanley (1876–1961), New York State Senate
Thomas Burton Hanly (1812–1880), Arkansas State Senate

See also
Senator Handley (disambiguation)